Shikari  is a Bollywood film released in 1946, directed by Savak B. Vacha, starring Ashok Kumar, Kishore Kumar, Paro Devi and Veera. The music was directed by Anil Chandra Sengupta, with Sachin Dev Burman as the background singer.

Cast

Ashok Kumar
Kishore Kumar
Paro Devi
Veera
Leela Mishra
Rama Shukul
S L Puri

Soundtrack
All music composed by Anil Chandra Sengupta and Sachin Dev Burman and lyrics by Gopal Singh Nepali.

References

External links
 

1946 films
1940s Hindi-language films
Films scored by S. D. Burman
Indian musical films
1946 musical films
Indian black-and-white films
Saadat Hasan Manto